Enes Fermino (born 29 May 1987) is a Congolese and Swiss former professional footballer who played as a defensive midfielder.

Club career
Fermino began his career in the youth at FC Lausanne-Sport and was promoted to the first team in 2004. In 2005 he joined ES FC Malley, also in Lausanne.

He was scouted by FC La Chaux-de-Fonds, where he signed his first professional contract. On 6 January 2009, He left the club after 49 games and four goals and signed a contract by FC Sion between 30 June 2013.

International career
Fermino represented Switzerland at U-19 and U-20 level, before switching nationality to DR Congo, who he represented at U-21 level. He never played senior international football.

Honours 
Sion
Swiss Cup: 2008–09

References

External links
 
 

1987 births
Living people
Swiss men's footballers
Association football midfielders
Citizens of the Democratic Republic of the Congo through descent
Democratic Republic of the Congo footballers
Ghanaian emigrants to Switzerland
Swiss Super League players
National League (English football) players
FC Lausanne-Sport players
FC La Chaux-de-Fonds players
FC Sion players
FC Locarno players
Macclesfield Town F.C. players
Droylsden F.C. players
FC Köniz players
FC Le Mont players
FC Fribourg players
Swiss expatriate footballers
Democratic Republic of the Congo expatriate footballers
Swiss expatriate sportspeople in England
Democratic Republic of the Congo expatriate sportspeople in England
Expatriate footballers in England
21st-century Democratic Republic of the Congo people